Shane Willis (born June 13, 1977) is a Canadian former professional ice hockey right winger. Willis was born in Edmonton, Alberta, but grew up in Sylvan Lake, Alberta.

Career 
Willis was originally drafted by Tampa Bay 56th overall in the 1995 NHL Entry Draft, but unable to come to terms, he re-entered the draft and was selected 88th overall by the Carolina Hurricanes in the 1997 NHL Entry Draft. Willis was drafted from the Western Hockey League where he played for the Prince Albert Raiders and Lethbridge Hurricanes.

In 1999, his first full professional season, Willis won the Dudley "Red" Garrett Memorial Award as the top rookie of the American Hockey League, while playing for the Beast of New Haven. Shane made his NHL debut for the Hurricanes in the 1998–99 before breaking out in the 2000–01 season, enjoying career highs of 20 goals and 24 assists.

Carolina qualified for the postseason in 2001 and faced the New Jersey Devils in the conference quarterfinals. Late in game 2, Willis was leveled by a Scott Stevens hit. He sat out the rest of the series. Combined with another hit the following season, an elbow to the face by Bryan Marchment, the injuries would hinder Willis' game, who would never score as much as in his rookie season.

In 2005–06, he played in Europe for Davos in Switzerland and for Linköpings HC in Sweden. He returned to North America for the 2006–07 season, signing with the Carolina Hurricanes on July 18, 2006. However, Willis spent the year playing with the Hurricanes affiliate, the Albany River Rats.

On July 5, 2007, Willis signed a one-year contract with the Nashville Predators but after his first game with affiliate, the Milwaukee Admirals, he was ruled out for the season.

In the 2008–09 season Willis had signed a tryout contract with the Columbus Blue Jackets for the 2008–09 season but was subsequently released on September 25, 2008. On January 13, 2009, Shane was signed by the Wheeling Nailers of the ECHL to a player/coach role. After one game Willis was then signed by former team the Springfield Falcons of the AHL to a professional try-out contract on January 16, 2009.    
Willis has played 174 career NHL games, scoring 31 goals and 43 assists for 74 points.

On September 8, 2011, Willis was hired as the Youth and Amateur Hockey Coordinator for the Carolina Hurricanes.

Awards and achievements
1996–97  WHL  East First All-Star Team
1997–98  WHL  East First All-Star Team
1998–99  AHL  All-Rookie Team
1998–99  AHL  First All-Star Team
1998–99  AHL  Dudley "Red" Garrett Memorial Award
2000–01  NHL  All-Rookie Team

Career statistics

Regular season and playoffs

International

References

External links

1977 births
Albany River Rats players
Beast of New Haven players
Canadian ice hockey right wingers
Carolina Hurricanes draft picks
Carolina Hurricanes players
Cincinnati Cyclones (IHL) players
HC Davos players
Hershey Bears players
Ice hockey people from Alberta
Lethbridge Hurricanes players
Linköping HC players
Living people
Milwaukee Admirals players
People from Red Deer County
Prince Albert Raiders players
Ice hockey people from Edmonton
Springfield Falcons players
Tampa Bay Lightning draft picks
Tampa Bay Lightning players
Wheeling Nailers players
Canadian expatriate ice hockey players in Switzerland
Canadian expatriate ice hockey players in Sweden